This is the solo discography of Peter Gabriel, an English singer-songwriter, musician and humanitarian activist who rose to fame as the lead vocalist and flautist of the progressive rock band Genesis. After leaving Genesis, Gabriel went on to a successful solo career. His 1986 album, So, is his most commercially successful, selling five million copies in America, and the album's biggest hit, "Sledgehammer", won a record nine MTV Awards at the 1987 MTV Video Music Awards. The song is the most played music video in the history of the station.

Gabriel has been a champion of world music for much of his career. He co-founded the WOMAD festival in 1982. He has continued to focus on producing and promoting world music through his Real World Records label. He has also pioneered digital distribution methods for music, co-founding OD2, one of the first online music download services. Gabriel has been involved in numerous humanitarian efforts. In 1980, he released the anti-apartheid single "Biko". He has participated in several human rights benefit concerts, including Amnesty International's Human Rights Now! tour in 1988, and co-founded the Witness human rights organisation in 1992. In collaboration with entrepreneur Richard Branson, Gabriel developed The Elders, which was launched by Nelson Mandela in 2007.

Gabriel has won numerous music awards throughout his career, including three Brit Awards—winning Best British Male in 1987, six Grammy Awards, thirteen MTV Video Music Awards, the first Pioneer Award at the BT Digital Music Awards, and in 2007, he was honoured as a BMI Icon at the 57th annual BMI London Awards for his "influence on generations of music makers". In recognition of his many years of human rights activism, he received the Man of Peace award from the Nobel Peace Prize Laureates in 2006, and in 2008, TIME magazine named Gabriel one of the 100 most influential people in the world. Gabriel was also awarded the Ivor Novello Award for Lifetime Achievement in 2007, and the Polar Music Prize in 2009.

AllMusic has described Gabriel as "one of rock's most ambitious, innovative musicians, as well as one of its most political." He was inducted into the Rock and Roll Hall of Fame as a member of Genesis in 2010, followed by his induction as a solo artist in 2014.

Albums

Studio albums

Soundtrack albums

Live albums

Encore Series 2003, Encore Series 2004, Encore Series 2007, Encore Series 2009, Encore Series 2012, Encore Series 2013, Encore Series 2014 and Encore Series 2014-winter

Compilation albums

Other albums

Singles

Notes

a.  "Shock the Monkey" also reached No. 64 on the Billboard R&B Singles chart and No. 26 on the Dance Music/Club Play chart.
b.  "Sledgehammer" also reached No. 61 on the Billboard Hot R&B/Hip-Hop Singles & Tracks chart and No. 1 on the Dance Music/Club Play chart.
c.  "In Your Eyes" was certified Gold by the RIAA.
d.  "Shakin' the Tree also reached No. 9 on the Billboard Modern Rock Tracks chart.
e.  "Digging in the Dirt" also reached No. 1 on the Billboard Modern Rock Tracks chart.
f.  "Steam" also reached No. 1 on the Billboard Modern Rock Tracks chart.
g.  "Kiss That Frog" also reached No. 18 on the Billboard Modern Rock Tracks chart.
h.  "Lovetown" also reached No. 22 on the Billboard Modern Rock Tracks chart.
i.  "When You're Falling" also reached No. 27 on the Billboard Adult Top 40 chart.
j.  "The Barry Williams Show" was deemed ineligible for the UK Singles Chart, as its length broke chart regulations for single releases, therefore it was instead listed as an EP and featured on the Budget Albums Chart where it reached No. 4.

Other charting tracks

Non-album tracks

Studio

Other songs

 1981 "Not One of Us (Live)", "Humdrum (Live)" and "Ain't That Peculiar (Live)" on The Bristol Recorder 2
1984 "I Go Swimming" (Live) (Hard to Hold soundtrack)
1987 "Biko (Live)" by Habib Faye, Lou Reed, Papa Oumar N'Gom, Peter Gabriel, Rick Bell, & Youssou N'Dour (The Secret Policeman's Third Ball)
1990 "Drone" on the album One World One Voice
1993 "Be Still" with Sinéad O'Connor, Feargal Sharkey, and others as Peace Together, on the album Peace Together
1994 "Biko (Live)" (Woodstock '94)
 1996 "I Have the Touch ('96 Remix)" (Remixed by Robbie Robertson and P. Gabriel, music from the motion picture Phenomenon)
 1997 "Shaking the Tree '97 (Jungle Version) (Jungle 2 Jungle soundtrack)
 1998 "I Grieve" (City of Angels soundtrack, re-edit later released on Up)
 2000 "The Tower That Ate People (Remix)" (Red Planet soundtrack)
 2002 "Shaking the Tree (02 Remix)" (The Wild Thornberrys Movie soundtrack)
 2002 "Signal to Noise" (Gangs of New York soundtrack) (instrumental version)
 2004 "The Book of Love," song by Stephin Merrit (Shall We Dance? soundtrack, re-recorded for Scratch My Back; compiled on Rated PG)
 2007 "Different Stories, Different Lives" (with The Footnote and Angie Pollock Sea Monsters: A Prehistoric Adventure soundtrack, unreleased)

Appears on

 1970 "Katmandu" <flute> on the album Mona Bone Jakon by Cat Stevens
 1979 "Exposure" and "Here Comes the Flood" on the album Exposure by Robert Fripp
 1981 "Animals Have More Fun" with Jimmy Pursey
 1981 "Screaming Jets" on the album Walking into Mirrors by Johnny Warman
 1984 "Gravity's Angel", "Language D'Amour" and "Excellent Birds" on the album Mister Heartbreak by Laurie Anderson
 1985 "Take Me Home" <background vocals> on the album No Jacket Required by Phil Collins
 1986 "Everywhere I Go" <background vocals> on the album Reconciled by The Call
 1987 "Fallen Angel" and "Broken Arrow" on the album Robbie Robertson by Robbie Robertson
 1987 "Do What You Do" and "I Got Your Message" on the album Do What You Do by The Epidemics
 1987 "Winds of Change (Mandela To Mandela)" on the album Female Trouble by Nona Hendryx
 1988 "My Secret Place", a single from the album Chalk Mark in a Rain Storm by Joni Mitchell
 1989 "Shakin' the Tree" by Youssou N'Dour on the album The Lion (a different version, with Peter Gabriel's lead vocals, appears on Gabriel's 1990 compilation Shaking the Tree)
 1990 "Soul Searcher" <keyboards> by L. Shankar
 1990 "Land of Anaka" <background vocals> by Geoffrey Oryema on the album Exile
 1991 "Fisherman's Song", "Lullaby", "Octopuse's Song", "Song of the Seashell" and "Witch's Song" on the album Die Nixe - The Mermaid
 1991 "Silence" and "Warm Doorway" <background vocals> on the album It's About Time by Manu Katché
 1994 "I Met a Man" on the album The Woman's Boat by Toni Childs
 1994 "Quelquer Coisa A Haver Com O Paraíso on the album Angelus by Milton Nascimento
 1994 "Biko" <background vocals> on the album Wakafrika by Manu Dibango
 1996 "I'm Still Looking for a Home" on the album Tender City by Joy Askew
 1996 "Hush, Hush, Hush" on the album This Fire by Paula Cole
 1996 "Mercedes" <background vocals> by Joseph Arthur
 1998 storyteller on the album Snowflake by Paul Gallico
 1998 "Blind" on the album Soularium by Sister Soleil
 1999 "Kufilaw" with Maryam Mursal on the album 11 out of 10
 1999 "Carpet Crawlers '99" by Genesis
 2000 "This Dream" <background vocals> by Youssou N'Dour on the album Joko from Village to Town and/or "Joko: The Link"
 2001 "When You're Falling" (Afro Celt Sound System – Volume 3: Further in Time)
 2001 "Games Without Frontiers [Massive/DM Mix]"  (Pure Moods, Vol. 3)
 2004 "Washing of the Water" with Jools Holland & his Rhythm & Blues Orchestra on the album Friends 3
 2006 "Here Comes The Flood" (quiet version) and "Preface" on the album Exposure by Robert Fripp – reissue with extra tracks
 2006 "Salala" on the album Djin Djin by Angelique Kidjo
 2022 "Unconditional II (Race and Religion)" on the album WE by Arcade Fire

Production

Videos

Video albums
 1987 CV (compilation of music videos, VHS) (RIAA: Gold)
 1990 POV (live concert from the So tour 1987, VHS)
 1993 All About Us (music videos for Us album, VHS)
 1994 Secret World Live (live concert from the Secret World Tour 1993/94, VHS) (RIAA: Platinum)
 2002 Secret World Live (re-release, first time on DVD)
 2003 Growing Up Live (live concert from the Growing Up Tour 2002/03, DVD) (RIAA: Platinum)
 2004 Play (compilation of music videos, including bonus videos and remastered sound. The music has been remixed on several tracks and the original mix is available as an alternate audio track, DVD)
 2004 A Family Portrait – A Film by Anna Gabriel (Peter Gabriel's daughter, Anna-Marie Gabriel, directs a film about her father's Growing Up and Still Growing Up tours, DVD)
 2005 Still Growing Up: Live & Unwrapped (live concert from the Still Growing Up Tour 2004, DVD)
 2011 New Blood: Live in London (live concert from the New Blood tour 2011, DVD)
 2013 Classic Albums So (documentary on the making of the So album, DVD)
 2013 Live in Athens 1987 (re-release of POV, first time on DVD)
 2014 Back to Front: Live in London (live concert from the Back to Front tour 2013, DVD)

Music videos

References

Discography
Rock music discographies
Discographies of British artists